Development is the second album released by American rock band Nonpoint. It was their final album released through MCA Records.

The album debuted at No. 52 on the Billboard 200 album chart. The single, "Your Signs", hit No. 29 on Billboard Active Rock chart, and No. 35 on the Mainstream Rock Airplay chart, both in early July.

Critical reception
AllMusic wrote that the album "finds the band literally developing its own signature sound, in the process refining its scope to a much sharper point."

Track listing
Tracks 1–12 by Nonpoint.

Personnel 

Members
Elias Soriano - lead vocals
Robbie Rivera - drums
Ken "K. Bastard" MacMillan - bass
Andrew Goldman - guitars, backing vocals

Production
Produced by Jason Bieler & Nonpoint
Engineered by Keith Rose and Chad Milosevich
Mixed by Bob Clearmountin, at Mix This Studios, Pacific Palisades, California
Mastered by Mike Fuller
Drum tech: Tony R. Adams
A&R by Gary Ashley, Hans Haedelt & Jeanne Venton
Photo by Matt Swig

References

Nonpoint albums
2002 albums
MCA Records albums